INAS World Swimming Championships are a quadrennial international swimming competition organised by International Sports Federation for Persons with Intellectual Disability for athletes who have an intellectual impairment and swim in the S14 swimming category in Paralympic swimming.

Swimming events contested
All swimming events were contested in long course (50 metre) swimming pools.

Hosts

Medal table

See also
World Para Swimming Championships

References

Paralympic swimming
Parasports world championships
Recurring sporting events established in 1999